The World Monuments Watch is a flagship advocacy program of the New York-based private non-profit organization World Monuments Fund (WMF) that calls international attention to cultural heritage around the world that is threatened by neglect, vandalism, conflict, or disaster.

Selection process
Every two years, it publishes a select list known as the Watch List of Endangered Sites that are in urgent need of preservation funding and protection. The sites are nominated by governments, conservation professionals, site caretakers, non-government organizations (NGOs), concerned individuals, and others working in the field. An independent panel of international experts then select 100 candidates from these entries to be part of the Watch List, based on the significance of the sites, the urgency of the threat, and the viability of both advocacy and conservation solutions. For the succeeding two-year period until a new Watch List is published, these 100 sites can avail grants and funds from the WMF, as well as from other foundations, private donors, and corporations by capitalizing on the publicity and attention gained from the inclusion on the Watch List.

2012 Watch List
The 2012 Watch List was published on 5 October 2011.

Statistics by country/territory
The following countries/territories have multiple sites entered on the 2012 Watch List, listed by the number of sites:

References

Historic preservation